The American Carpatho-Russian Orthodox Diocese of North America (ACROD) is a diocese of the Ecumenical Patriarchate with 78 parishes in the United States and Canada. Though the diocese is directly responsible to the Patriarchate, it is under the spiritual supervision of the Primate of the Greek Orthodox Archdiocese of America.

The diocese was led by Metropolitan Nicholas Smisko of Amissos (1936–2011). The current leader is the Metropolitan of Nyssa, Gregory Tatsis, who was consecrated on November 27, 2012.

History

At the end of the nineteenth century, many East Slavs immigrated to North America. They were Christians, some of them belonging to Eastern Orthodoxy, while others were Eastern Catholics of the Byzantine Rite. In Catholic terminology, East-Slavic form of the Byzantine Rite was known as the Ruthenian Rite, and thus the same Ruthenian designation was applied to East Slavs of that rite.

At that time, there were no Eastern Catholic jurisdictions in North America, and thus the first Eastern Catholic parishes were formed under jurisdiction of local Catholic bishops of the Latin Church. The Roman Catholic hierarchs, mostly Irish and Polish, however, did not readily welcome Eastern Catholics of the Ruthenian Rite, fearing the "scandal" that the presence of married priests would have on their own flock.

Oppression of the Eastern Catholics of the Byzantine Rite by the bishops of the predominant Latin Rite Catholics, especially regarding a married priesthood and the form of the Divine Liturgy or Mass, led some of them out of Catholicism and into the Eastern Orthodox Church. A particularly strident opponent of non-Latin practices was John Ireland the Archbishop of St. Paul, Minnesota from 1888–1918, who refused to permit Eastern Catholic clergy to function in his archdiocese.

The diocese was founded in 1938 when a group of 37 Ruthenian Eastern Catholic parishes, under the leadership of Fr. Orestes Chornock, were received into the jurisdiction of the Ecumenical Patriarchate. The year before, this group had officially renounced the Unia with the Holy See, primarily in protest over the Liturgical Latinisation occurring in their church life. A particularly divisive issue was the 1929 papal decree Cum data fuerit issued by Pope Pius XI which mandated that Eastern Rite clergy in the US were to be celibate.

This move actually marked the second North American group of Ruthenian-Rite Catholic parishes to move to Eastern Orthodoxy. The first had been led by Alexis Toth of Wilkes-Barre into the jurisdiction of the Russian Metropolia in the 1890s. Notably, this second large-scale conversion to Eastern Orthodoxy by Ruthenian-Rite Catholics was directed toward Constantinople rather than to the Russian presence in North America.

This was primarily motivated out of concerns for preservation of a specific identity, since many among Ruthenian-Rite Catholics self-identified as Rusyns, and wanted to keep their distinctive identity, thus opposing Russification, which had occurred with the previous move. As such, rather than being absorbed into the body of Russian churches, and so being compelled to adopt Muscovite traditions, the ACROD was permitted by Constantinople to keep its distinctive Rusyn practices. Thus, the hymnography in the typical Ruthenian Prostopinije-chant and liturgical forms, including the particular form of Old Church Slavonic used in the divine services, were preserved, while certain Latin Rite practices, such as the addition of the Filioque clause to the Nicene Creed, were removed.

Organization
In 2006, the ACROD had 14,372 members in 78 parishes and five missions. The bulk of the diocese's parishes are in 13 states in the eastern United States, with two parishes and two missions in Ontario; nearly half of the parishes are located in Pennsylvania.

There used to be two monasteries in the diocese: the Monastery of the Annunciation, in Tuxedo Park, New York which closed in the early 1990s, and the Monastery of the Holy Cross, at Beallsville, Maryland which dissolved in the late 1990s when its abbot converted to Ruthenian (Byzantine Rite) Catholicism.

The diocese is a member of the Assembly of Canonical Orthodox Bishops of the United States of America.

Christ the Saviour Seminary
The Christ the Savior Seminary is part of the diocese. It is located in Johnstown, Pennsylvania. The seminary was founded by the first bishop of the diocese, Orestes (Chornock), in 1940. The seminary, at first, not having a permanent home, moved and held classes in a number of northeastern United States cities, including New York City; Nicholson, Pennsylvania; and Bridgeport, Connecticut. In 1951, the diocese acquired the Strayer Mansion in Johnstown, Pennsylvania, that became the home of the seminary. The building has been developed to include class and lecture rooms and dining and recreation facilities, as well as a library and bookstore.

The main purpose of the seminary is to train priests for the ACROD and other Orthodox dioceses in the United States, as well as in foreign countries. The seminary places emphasis on pastorally-oriented training. It was approved in 1960 by the Pennsylvania State Council of Education to grant a Bachelor of Theology degree. The seminary has tailored curricula for five classifications of candidates: a three-year Bachelor of Theology program for students who already have baccalaureate degrees, a Licentiate of Theology diploma late vocations program for those without a previous undergraduate degree, and a special admissions program for individuals who do not intend to be ordained to the Orthodox clergy.

Ruling bishops
 Orestes (Chornock) of Agathonikeia (1938–1977)
 John (Martin) of Nyssa (1977–1984)
 Nicholas (Smisko) of Amissos (1985–2011)
 Gregory (Tatsis) of Nyssa (2012–present)

References

Sources

External links

 American Carpatho-Russian Orthodox Diocese of North America
 Christ the Saviour Seminary
 Profile of the ACROD on the Association of Religion Data Archives website
 Article on ACROD by Ronald Roberson on the CNEWA website
 OrthodoxWiki:American Carpatho-Russian Orthodox Diocese, an OrthodoxWiki article

Christian organizations established in 1938
Eastern Orthodox dioceses in Canada
 
Dioceses established in the 20th century
Eastern Orthodox organizations established in the 20th century
Eastern Orthodox dioceses in the United States
Rusyn-American history
Rusyn Canadian
Rusyn_culture